The Disher Challenge Cup is awarded to the winner of an annual eight oar rowing boat race held over a distance of approximately 3 miles at a regatta between three tertiary institutions in the Australian Capital Territory: 
 the Royal Military College, Duntroon,
 the Australian National University, and
 the Australian Defence Force Academy.

Other crews race by invitation, but cannot be awarded the Cup.

History
The Disher Challenge Cup was named for Captain H.C. (Clive) Disher of the Australian Army Medical Corps, who stroked the 1919 Australian Imperial Force (AIF) Number 1 crew that beat Oxford University in the final of the Inter-Allied Services event at the Henley Peace Regatta after the end of the World War I.

Disher presented the Disher Cup to the inaugural winning crew, the Australian National University, in 1971.

Initially the Cup was between the Royal Military College and the Australian National University until the Australian Defence Force Academy was established in 1986.

The inscription reads:

Disher Cup Regatta
The regatta for the Disher Cup is held on Lake Burley Griffin, an artificial lake in the centre of Canberra, Australia's national capital city. The lake is about 10 km long. The original course was 4.8 km, from Sullivan's Creek at the ANU to the mouth of the Molonglo River near Duntroon.

The course was changed to be fairer and safer, at 4250 metres, that begins at Aspen Island, passes under Commonwealth Bridge and finishes at Yarralumla. Both the men's (for the Disher Challenge Cup) and women's eights race are over the 4250 metre course.

Races for men's and women's coxed fours over 2000 metres are also held as a part of the Disher Cup Regatta.

Other trophies contested for at the Disher Cup Regatta are:

 L.W. Nicholl Shield for men's 4s (first presented in 1989)
 Colonel Diane Harris Trophy for women's 4s (first presented in 1999)
 Anne Curtis Cup for women's 8s: RMC v ADFA v ANU (first presented in 1993)

Results

See also
 Henley Royal Regatta
 Rowing Australia
 Head of the River (Australia)
 Head of the River
 Head of the River Race

References

External links
 Rowing ACT
 Disher Cup
 Dr Clive Disher – Australian Dictionary of Biography
 Rowing Australia

History of rowing
Rowing competitions in Australia
Annual sporting events in Australia
1971 establishments in Australia
Sports competitions in Canberra
Recurring sporting events established in 1971